El Valle is a town in the Hato Mayor Province of the Dominican Republic.
Main street name: Maria Trinidad Sanchez.
River names: El Sano, Jaguera, and Janigua. 
There is a creek that divides the town. The creek is called Porquero (porkero), named after the locally raised swine that bathe in the creek.

References

External links
World Gazeteer: Dominican Republic – World-Gazetteer.com
OpenStreetMap - El Valle

Municipalities of the Dominican Republic
Populated places in Hato Mayor Province